Croatian money can refer to:

Croatian dinar (Croatian currency until 1994)
Croatian kuna and lipa (Croatian currency since 1994)
Independent State of Croatia kuna, a former Croatian currency used during World War II
Frizatik, a medieval Croatian currency